Glucagon-like peptide-2 receptor (GLP-2R) is a protein that in human is encoded by the GLP2R gene located on chromosome 17.

Function

The GLP2 receptor (GLP2R) is a G protein-coupled receptor superfamily member closely related to the glucagon receptor (GLP1 receptor). Glucagon-like peptide-2 (GLP2) is a 33-amino acid proglucagon-derived peptide produced by intestinal enteroendocrine cells. Like glucagon-like peptide-1 (GLP1) and glucagon itself, it is derived from the proglucagon peptide encoded by the GCG gene. GLP2 stimulates intestinal growth and upregulates villus height in the small intestine, concomitant with increased crypt cell proliferation and decreased enterocyte apoptosis. Moreover, GLP2 prevents intestinal hypoplasia resulting from total parenteral nutrition. GLP2R, a G protein-coupled receptor superfamily member is expressed in the gut and closely related to the glucagon receptor (GCGR) and the receptor for GLP1 (GLP1R).

See also
Glucagon-like peptide-2

References

Further reading

External links

G protein-coupled receptors